Sevinch Salaeva (born March 12, 1995), is an Uzbek Judoka, who competes for her nation. She won a bronze medal in the  weight class at the 2016 Summer Paralympics.

Career
Sevinch Salaeva was born on March 12, 1995. She trained in judo at the Khorezm Judo School. She took part in the International Blind Sports Federation World Championships in Colorado, United States, in 2014, where she placed fifth overall. Later that year, she won her weight class at the 2014 Asian Para Games in Incheon, South Korea. Salaeva placed fifth once again at the IBSA World Games in Seoul, South Korea.

At the Paralympic Judo Grand Prix event in Rio de Janeiro in March 2016, held as a warm up to that year's Summer Paralympics, Salaeva placed second in the women's  category. At the 2016 Games themselves in September that year, Salaeva took part in the first day of the competition. She was defeated in the semi-finals of the Judo tournament in the 52 kg class, but went on to win the bronze medal match against Canadian Priscilla Gagné. This was Uzbekistan's most successful day so far at the Paralympics, as the nation had only previously won a single medal at the 2012 Summer Paralympics in London, England. Alongside Salaeva's bronze medal, two further gold medals were added.

References

Living people
1995 births
Uzbekistani female judoka
Uzbekistani women
Judoka at the 2016 Summer Paralympics
20th-century Uzbekistani women
21st-century Uzbekistani women
Paralympic medalists in judo
Medalists at the 2016 Summer Paralympics
Paralympic bronze medalists for Uzbekistan
Paralympic judoka of Uzbekistan